Henry Wallace Doveton Dunlop (1844 – 1930) was a sports promoter, civil servant, engineer and, a former leader of Irish Rugby, founder of Lansdowne Football Club and figure behind the construction of the former Lansdowne Road stadium.

An engineering graduate of Trinity College, Dublin, he founded the Dublin club Lansdowne as well as a host of other sports club sharing the Lansdowne name. He was also the driving force behind the construction of the Lansdowne Road stadium.

Lansdowne and Lansdowne Road
Dunlop founded the Irish Champion Athletic Club in 1871.
After an initial meeting at Trinity College, the Provost of the College banned any further meeting on campus. Dunlop had to find a new home for his sporting endeavours. Writing in 1921, Dunlop stated: "I was therefore forced to look for another plot, and after careful consideration chose the present Lansdowne Road one. In conjunction with the late Edward Dillon (my trainer), I took a 69 year lease from the Pembroke Estate, paying a ground rent of £60 per annum, of part only of the premises stretching from the railway to about 60 yards from the Dodder. I laid down a cinder running path of a quarter-mile, laid down the present Lansdowne Tennis Club ground with my own theodolite, started a Lansdowne archery club, a Lansdowne cricket club, and last, but not least, the Lansdowne Rugby Football Club - colours red, black and yellow. On the tennis club grounds the first tennis championship was held long before Fitzwilliam meetings."

Dunlop founded Lansdowne Football Club in 1872 and that club has played rugby union ever since at the grounds, being one of the most prominent and successful rugby clubs in Leinster and Ireland. Wanderers Football Club, founded in 1869, joined Lansdowne at the grounds later. The two clubs were tenants since that time, and also use the new Aviva Stadium.

Some 300 cartloads of soil from a trench beneath the railway were used to raise the ground, allowing Dunlop to utilise his engineering expertise to create a pitch envied around Ireland.

Rugby gradually became the main use of the grounds: the first representative rugby match was an inter provincial fixture between Leinster and Ulster in December 1876, and on 11 March 1878, Lansdowne Road hosted its first international rugby fixture, against England, making it the world's oldest rugby union Test venue. Dunlop charged the IRFU £5 and half of any profits over £50 after expenses. The first victory Ireland had at the ground took place on 5 February 1887, against England. Around this time, the treasurer of the IRFU, Harry Sheppard, acquired the lease from Dunlop and when Sheppard died in 1906, the union paid his estate £200 for the lease.

Personal life
Dunlop attended Trinity College, Dublin, where he studied engineering. Dunlop is an ancestor of Irish racehorse trainer Mouse Morris, through his granddaughter, Sheila, the mother of Morris.

References

1844 births
1930 deaths
Alumni of Trinity College Dublin